Safari is a 1956 British CinemaScope adventure film directed by Terence Young and set during the Mau Mau Uprising in Kenya. It stars Victor Mature, Janet Leigh, Roland Culver, John Justin, and Earl Cameron, and was intentionally cast to attract an American audience—both the hero and the lead female character are Americans, played by American actors.

Plot
While American white hunter Ken Duffield (Victor Mature) is off leading a safari, Mau Mau rebels attack his farm, slaughtering the labourers and his livestock. Duffield's young son Charlie and Aunt May (Estelle Brody) defend their home against the mass attack but they do not know that their houseboy Jeroge (a corruption of Njoroge) (Earl Cameron) is actually a Mau Mau general. Inside the farmhouse, Jeroge murders Aunt May with a machete and Charlie is killed with May's rifle.

When Duffield returns to his destroyed homestead, the police have obtained information about Jeroge's role in the affair. Surmising that Duffield will use his hunting expertise to track down and revenge himself on the terrorists in general and Jeroge in particular, they escort him back to Nairobi and revoke his hunting licence until the situation and Duffield cools down.

Duffield spends his exile in Nairobi drinking and gathering information about Jeroge from his African friends. He gets his chance for revenge when the rich Sir Vincent Brampton (Roland Culver), accompanied by his flunky Brian (John Justin) and his young American trophy fiancée Linda (Janet Leigh), arrive in Nairobi. They are keen to hire Duffield to lead a safari so that Sir Vincent can kill a legendary man-eating lion named "Hatari" (Swahili for "risky" or "dangerous"). Duffield knows that Hatari resides in an area which Jeroge is known to frequent, and that Sir Vincent can use his influence to get his hunting licence back.

Setting off on safari with his boss boy Jerusalem (Orlando Martins) and Odongo (Juma), Sir Vincent suspects Duffield is not interested in hunting lions when he carries a Sten gun; Duffield explaining "you never know what kind of animals you may find". Sir Vincent has his suspicion confirmed when Duffield jumps out of his Land Rover to join the police in a firefight against the Mau Mau and is keen to extract information from the prisoners.

Duffield keeps his promise to bring Sir Vincent and his party to Hatari's turf in the land of the Maasai, where the audience witnesses a traditional Maasai lion hunt. But his plans face peril when a police radio report reveals that an unknown member of the safari is a Mau Mau plant. In addition, the obsessive Sir Vincent is determined to get sole credit for killing Hatari and therefore unloads Duffield's rifle, while Linda decides to take an excursion down a crocodile-infested river in a rubber dinghy. Another police radio report warns that 200 Mau Mau prisoners have escaped and are headed towards Duffield's safari to link up with Jeroge.

Sir Vincent is so obsessed with killing the lion that he fires at Duffield. In the midst of this situation, Hatari the lion appears on a ledge above Sir Vincent and pounces. Although the lion is killed it has fatally wounded Sir Vincent.

In a final scene, the group and local police, have to each take arms to defend themselves against an onslaught from Mau Mau attackers, and Duffield's sten gun is put to use.

Main cast

 Victor Mature as Ken Duffield 
 Janet Leigh as Linda Latham 
 John Justin as Brian Sinden 
 Roland Culver as Sir Vincent Brampton 
 Liam Redmond as Roy Shaw 
 Earl Cameron as Jeroge (Njoroge)
 Orlando Martins as Jerusalem 
 Juma as Odongo 
 Lionel Ngakane as Kakora
 Harry Quashie as O'Keefe  
 Slim Harris as Renegade  
 Cy Grant as Chief Massai  
 John Wynn as Charley  
 Arthur Lovegrove as Blake  
 Estelle Brody as Aunty May

Production

Development
Rhonda Fleming was originally announced for the female lead and the producers were hoping to get Humphrey Bogart to star.

Location filming in Kenya began in June 1955 before the film had been cast. Victor Mature had signed a two-picture contract with Warwick Films and he was assigned to the lead. He was meant to make Zarak but ended up making Safari first.

Shooting
Filming began 1 August 1955 in Elstree Studios in London. Five weeks later the unit transferred to Kenya for location shooting.

The film was shot on location in Kenya simultaneously with John Gilling's Odongo with the Zanzibar-born child actor Juma repeating his role as Odongo. In an interview in 1997, Janet Leigh recalled that the film's second unit was actually attacked by the Mau Mau.

Reception
The film premiered on 6 April 1956 at the Empire Cinema in London, and the reviewer for The Times was not very favourable, in a review titled "'Safari': An American film about the Mau Mau":

"Surely it is neither priggish nor pompous to find something disagreeable in the idea of so horrifying an episode as the Mau Mau terrorism in Kenya serving as material for a film whose purpose is solely to entertain – another film, made with a British cast on the same subject, has a purpose above and beyond that. Again, it is not intolerably insular to take the line that it is all wrong that an American, played by an American actor, should be the hero, and shown as the only one capable of dealing with the situation. Finally, there are those squeamish enough not to feel altogether comfortable at the sight of an elephant, a lion, and a rhinoceros being shot – it is to be hoped the scenes were faked – to give the audience a vicarious thrill. -- A film that leaves an unpleasant taste in the mouth."

References

External links
 
 
 

1956 films
1956 drama films
British drama films
Films set in Kenya
CinemaScope films
Films directed by Terence Young
Columbia Pictures films
Films about hunters
Films shot in Kenya
Films set in the British Empire
Films scored by William Alwyn
1950s English-language films
1950s British films